Jeff Campbell is the Brinker Executive In Residence at the L. Robert Payne School of Hospitality & Tourism Management at San Diego State University and the Chairman of The Chairmen's Roundtable, a San Diego-based organization composed of former CEOs and entrepreneurs that engage in free-of-charge mentoring services for local businesses.

Career 
Campbell is the former CEO of Burger King and ex-Chairman of the Pillsbury Restaurant Group which, during his tenure, included the Burger King, Steak and Ale, Bennigan's and Godfather's Pizza restaurant chains.

He has also held the posts of Senior Vice President Brand Development for Pepsi-Cola, as well as CEO of the Johnny Rockets and Catalina Restaurant Groups.

Education
Campbell has a B.A. in Psychology from Fairfield University, an M.B.A. in marketing from Columbia University and an M.A. in History from the University of Miami.

References

External links
San Diego State University: J. Jeffrey Campbell
The Chairman's Roundtable: J. Jeffrey Campbell

American chief executives of food industry companies
Living people
Burger King people
Columbia Business School alumni
Fairfield University alumni
Year of birth missing (living people)
University of Miami alumni